The ČD Class 340 is a multisystem electric locomotive, designed for use between the Czech Republic and Austria. A total of three locomotives were rebuilt from the earlier 240 class. Since 2007, all three have been allocated to ČD Cargo.

History 
When the railway from Horní Dvořiště, in the Czech Republic to Summerau, in Austria, was electfied, this left ČD with a problem. They owned no locomotives that could operate on both the Czech 25 kV 50 Hz electrification, and the Austrian 15 kV 16.7 Hz electrification. This left ČD having to use ČD 771 class diesel locomotives on these trains. It was decided to convert the 340 class from the 240 class, due to a shortage of the originally intended 163 class.

References

Bibliography 
 

Škoda locomotives
Electric locomotives of the Czech Republic
Bo′Bo′ electric locomotives of Europe